Aerotur-KZ Airlines was an airline based in Taraz, Kazakhstan, which operated charter flights out of Taraz Airport, using a fleet of two Tupolev Tu-154 aircraft.

History
Aerotur-KZ was founded in 2006. On 1 April 2009, its airline license was revoked, shortly before the airline was added to the List of air carriers banned in the European Union due to the poor maintenance standards in Kazakhstan.

Fleet
Aerotur-KZ operated 2 Tupolev Tu-154s between 2006 and 2009.

References

External links

Defunct airlines of Kazakhstan
Airlines established in 2006
Airlines disestablished in 2009